Calamus muelleri, commonly known as southern lawyer cane or wait-a-while, is a climbing palm with a vine-like habit, endemic to the subtropical coastal rainforests of northern New South Wales and southern Queensland. Sharp hooks on the plant can snag the clothing of walkers in these forests, giving rise to the name "wait-a-while".

Description
The pinnate fronds are alternate and more or less sessile. The leaflets have spines along the midrib on the upper surface and small sharp spurs on their margins. The leaf sheath is densely covered in spines.

Taxonomy
The southern lawyer cane was first described by the German botanist and noted authority on Arecaceae Hermann Wendland, based on specimens collected by Hermann Beckler and others on the Brisbane River and Moreton Bay in Queensland and on the Clarence and Richmond Rivers in New South Wales. Wendland's work was published in the journal Linnaea; Ein Journal für die Botanik in ihrem ganzen Umfange in 1875.

Distribution and habitat
Calamus muelleri grows in rainforests and wet sclerophyll forests in subtropical eastern Australia, from around Gympie in Queensland south to the Bellinger and Hastings Rivers in New South Wales.

Ecology
Laetesia raveni, a species of spider endemic to eastern Australia, builds its web only in two plant species, Calamus muelleri and Solanum inaequilaterum, both of which are spiny plants.

Conservation
This species is listed by the Queensland Department of Environment and Science as least concern. , it has not been assessed by the IUCN.

Uses
Aboriginal Australians used the cane stems for weaving.

Gallery

References

External links
 
 
 View a map of recorded sightings of Calamus muelleri at the Australasian Virtual Herbarium
 See images of Calamus muelleri on Flickriver

muelleri
Plants described in 1875
Flora of New South Wales
Flora of Queensland
Taxa named by Hermann Wendland